Ordinaire may refer to:
 Ordinaire (wine bar), a wine bar in Oakland, California
 Ordinaire EP, an EP by Stepdad
 "Ordinaire", a 1970 song by Robert Charlebois, covered by Celine Dion in 2016 on Encore un soir
 Ordinaire, a rank in the hierarchy of the court's musicians, held by Marguerite-Antoinette Couperin et al.

See also
 Bourgogne Grand Ordinaire
 Temperament ordinaire (French tempérament ordinaire musical intonation)
 Vin ordinaire